Bernard Meretyn (also Bernard Merettiner, born near or at the end of the 17th century – January 3 or January 4, 1759) was an architect of the late Baroque and rococo of German origin. He worked in Western Ukraine, which in the 18th century was part of the Kingdom of Poland. In particular, he worked in Lviv (St. George's Cathedral, Lviv), Buchach (Buchach townhall), Vynnyky.

According to Ukrainian researcher Volodymyr Vujcyk by analysing multiple signatures architect used as: Meretynier Bernat architectus, Meretync, Meredyn, Merettyn, Mirydyn, Mertynier, Merderer, Bernadt architecto, Bernat, Bennard, Merettini, Meretyn, he was able to identify his original German surname was Merettiner.

Sources
Zbigniew Hornung. Merenyn Bernard (zm. 1759) // Polski Słownik Biograficzny.— Wrocław — Warszawa — Kraków — Gdańsk, 1978.— t. ХХ/3, zeszyt 86.— 409–616 s.— S. 442-444.
Bernard Meretyn - biography

External links
 Meretyn, Bernard in the Encyclopedia of Ukraine, article originally appeared in the Encyclopedia of Ukraine, vol. 3 (1993).

People from Buchach
Architects from Lviv
Ukrainian Baroque architects
17th-century births
1759 deaths
Rococo architects